The Movement for Social Democracy (EDEK) is a Greek Cypriot, social-democratic political party in Cyprus.

Overview
The party was founded by Vasos Lyssaridis in 1969 as the United Democratic Union of the Centre, EDEK (ΕΔΕΚ). It was originally a strongly anti-imperialist Third World socialist party with roots in the struggle against British colonial rule, influenced by the philosophies of Baathism, Muammar Gaddafi and Nasserism, and by the 1968 movement. Since the early 1980s, EDEK has evolved into a European-style social-democratic party. It has however not given up its nationalist orientations. The party changed its name to "Movement for Social Democracy" in 2000.

EDEK is led by Marinos Sizopoulos and is a member of the Party of European Socialists and Socialist International.

History

Formation and early years

Members were drawn from the committee for re-establishment of democracy in Greece, and fighters from Lyssaridis's group during the 1964 clashes between Greek and Turkish Cypriots. Lyssaridis was the personal physician of Archbishop Makarios III, the first president of independent Cyprus, whom the party supported. The party's name was inspired by Greek's Centre Union (EK) of Georgios Papandreou. It positioned itself in "the space inbetween" (neither left nor right). EDEK had links to the international Non-Aligned Movement and was opposed to the right-wing Colonels' regime in Greece. Many of the party's members were part of the armed resistance to the 15 July 1974 coup against Makarios. The leader of the youth section of the party, Doros Loizou, was shot and killed in an attempt to murder Lyssaridis in August 1974.

Several members of the party's youth section (EDEN) with Trotskyist tendencies were expelled between 1979 and 1984, who then formed Aristeri Pteryga (Left Wing).

During the late 1990s, EDEK negotiated with several minor parties, planning to merge all political forces between the communist AKEL and the conservative DISY into a major centrist party. It merged with two small groups, the Renewal Movement and the Independent Personalities Group, in February 2000. This was marked by its name change to "Movement for Social Democracy" (KISOS), which was also intended to bring the party closer to European social democratic parties in terms of both values and appearance. However, only two months after the merger, the members of the Renewal Movement left, citing a "lack of trust" vis-à-vis old EDEK members. Therefore, basically "the new KISOS was the old EDEK".

21st century

In the 2001 general elections EDEK won 6.5% of the votes cast and 4 of the 56 seats in the House of Representatives of Cyprus. EDEK was one of the most outspoken opponents of the Annan Plan for the reunification of Cyprus, which was voted on, and ultimately rejected by the Greek Cypriot community in the 2004 referendum. In the elections of 21 May 2006, the first since the referendum, the party increased its vote share to 8.9%, and won 5 out of 56 seats.

EDEK backed Dimitris Christofias of the Progressive Party of Working People (AKEL) in the second round of the February 2008 presidential election. On the proposal of EDEK's Political Bureau, 109 members of its Central Committee voted in favor of supporting Christofias, five voted against, and two abstained.
In February 2010 EDEK quit from the government coalition due to its dispute concerning the decisions of Dimitris Christofias in the Cyprus Problem.

The party leader, Yiannakis Omirou, was elected as President of the House of Representatives of the Republic of Cyprus, following the 2011 general elections, in which EDEK obtained 8.93% of the votes and five seats in Parliament.

In the February 2013 presidential election, EDEK backed the independent candidate Yiorgos Lillikas. The former minister of foreign affairs in Tassos Papadopoulos' cabinet. In the second round, EDEK decided not to back any other candidate, neither the DISY candidate Nicos Anastasiades, or AKEL candidate Stavros Malas.

In January 2015, House President Yiannakis Omirou resigned from EDEK's leadership. In March he was succeeded by his deputy Marinos Sizopoulos.

Election results

Parliament

European Parliament

Presidents of the Movement

 1969–2001: Dr. Vasos Lyssaridis
 2001–2015: Yiannakis Omirou
 since 2015: Marinos Sizopoulos

References

External links
Official website
Cyprus Elections & Politics

 
1969 establishments in Cyprus
Greek Cypriot nationalism
Full member parties of the Socialist International
Left-wing nationalist parties
Party of European Socialists member parties
Political parties established in 1969
Progressive Alliance
Social democratic parties
Socialist parties in Cyprus
Political parties in Cyprus